Aka Niviâna (born 1996 or born 1998) is a Kalaaleq (“Inuk” from Kalaallit Nunaat) writer, actress, songwriter, playwright, and climate activist originally from Upernavik, Kalaallit Nunaat (“Greenland” in Kalaallisut) based in Nuuk, Kalaallit Nunaat. She is known for her role in the 350.org- produced video-poem, Rise: From One Island to Another (2018).

Early Life 
Niviâna was born and raised in Upernavik, a small town located in Northern Kalaallit Nunaat. She and her family moved to Copenhagen, Denmark when Aka was seven years old where she lived for 18 years before returning to Nuuk, Greenland. Niviâna returned to Greenland with the purpose of relearning her first language of Kalaallisut (Greenlandic).

Career 
She began writing poetry while living in Copenhagen when she came to realize the lack of international knowledge about Greenland. 

Niviâna’s career includes work as a poet, songwriter, playwright, actress, director, and climate activist. She uses her Instagram account as a platform to communicate her work to the Kalaallit audience. 

She is known for her poetry work that creates conversations around climate change, colonialism, and Inuit rights across Kalaallit Nunaat, most notably for her role and writing of the 350.org-produced video-poem Rise: From One Island to Another (2018). Niviana’s work has been discussed as part of a growing movement of Black, Indigenous, and People of Colour (BIPOC) who work around themes of climate action and climate change.    

She has acted in the HBO’s crime-drama season 4 of True Detective - Night Country. She also acted in Borgen, a Danish political drama television series.

Her activist work focuses on climate change and suicide prevention among youth in Kalaallit Nunaat. She worked with Naalakkersuisut, the government of Kalaallit Nunaat to coordinate a biodiversity workshop.

Awards 
Niviâna was awarded the Climate Outreach’s People’s Choice Award in 2019.

References 

Wikipedia Student Program
Awards